is a district located in Nara Prefecture, Japan.

As of 2005, the district has an estimated population of 42,752 and a density of 113.98 persons per km2. The total area is 375.09 km2.

Towns and villages 
 Mitsue
 Soni

Merger 
 On January 1, 2006 the towns of Haibara, Murō and Ōuda, and the village of Utano merged to form the new city of Uda.

Districts in Nara Prefecture